CIXN-FM is a Canadian radio station in Fredericton, New Brunswick. It broadcasts christian contemporary music and other religious shows, and is found at 96.5 MHz. The station has been broadcasting since April 8, 2001.

References

External links
Joy FM 96.5
 

Ixn
Ixn
Radio stations established in 2001
2001 establishments in New Brunswick